is a Japanese sport wrestler who competes in the women's freestyle category. She claimed silver medal in the women's 55 kg event during the 2019 World Wrestling Championships.

References

External links
 

1995 births
Living people
Japanese female sport wrestlers
World Wrestling Championships medalists
Asian Wrestling Championships medalists
21st-century Japanese women